The Budapest University of Jewish Studies ( / Jewish Theological Seminary – University of Jewish Studies / ) is a university in Budapest, Hungary.  It was opened in 1877, a few decades after the first European rabbinical seminaries had been built in Padua, Metz, Paris and Breslau.  Still, it remains the oldest existing institution in the world where rabbis are graduated.

History

19th century 

The growing liberal segment in Hungarian Jewish society, known as Neologs, were interested in secularly-educated clergy and their leaders strove to have a modern seminary.
Orthodox Hungarian rabbis were very much against a rabbinical seminary. In order to prevent its establishment in Budapest, they sent a delegation to Emperor Francis Joseph of Austria in Vienna. 
However, the Emperor was favorable to the rabbinical school and even financed its construction, giving back to the Hungarian Jews the money they had had to pay 30 years before as a war tax after the Hungarian Revolution of 1848. 
On October 4, 1877, the seminary was opened in József körút.  Its first principal was Moses Löb Bloch, who was assisted by David Kaufmann and Wilhelm Bacher.

Second World War 
On March 19, 1944 German troops marched into Budapest (Operation Margarethe). The next day, the rabbinical seminary was confiscated by the Schutzstaffel (SS) and turned into a prison. From there, Adolf Eichmann organized the deportation of thousands of Hungarian Jews and some political detainees into the concentration camps, mainly to Auschwitz.

Just in time before the German invasion, the most valuable manuscripts had been brought into an underground safe. Still, an important part of the library was seized by the Nazis. 3000 books were dispatched to Prague, where Eichmann planned the construction of a "Museum of an extinct race" in the former Jewish quarter.  Only in the 1980s were the books discovered in the cellar of the Jewish Museum of Prague and brought back to Budapest in 1989.  The library remains a source of pride for the university.  It is considered one of the most important collection of Jewish theological literature outside Israel.

After the war, Communist era 
Immediately after the defeat of the Nazis, the Rabbinical seminary resumed its activity and was reopened two months before the surrender of Germany. However, the number of students was not sufficient for keeping the gymnasium department. Instead, a pedagogical college was arranged for religion and Hebrew teachers to be graduated.

Despite the anti-religious policy of the Communist government, the rabbinical seminary in Budapest remained alive. It was the only one of its kind in Eastern Europe, but strongly dependent on national authorities. Religious life was regulated by the Ministry of Religion which was responsible for filling vacant rabbinical posts in Hungary.

Being the only place of its kind in the Eastern bloc, the Budapest seminary had a special mission. Students came from all countries of Eastern Europe, from the Soviet Union and even from Israel, to be graduated as a rabbi or cantor. They lived, partly with their families, in small simply furnished boarding rooms.

From 1950 until his death in 1985, Sándor Scheiber was director of the seminary who edited important publications on Jewish studies from the Middle Ages to the 20th century.

After 1989 
After the end of communism, thanks to donations from abroad, the seminary building was renovated, the library modernized and some of the valuable old books were being restored.

Organization 
The institute was under the supervision of the ministry of religion, which appointed the teachers upon nomination by the council (consisting of twelve clerical and twelve lay members), of which M. Schweiger was president and Dr. J. Simon secretary, ever since 1877. The course of study extended over ten years and was divided into two equal periods; one being devoted to the lower department, the other to the upper. The former corresponded to an "Obergymnasium"; and the requirement for admission was the possession of a diploma from an "Untergymnasium", or the passing of an entrance examination covering a certain amount of Hebrew and Talmudics in addition to secular studies. The diplomas from this department were recognized by the state, and commanded admittance into any department of the universities or schools of technology. After the completion of the courses offered by the upper department, including attendance under the faculty of philosophy at the university, a year of probation followed. This was concluded in February by an oral examination after the candidate had presented three written theses on Biblical, rabbinic-Talmudic, and historical or religious-philosophical subjects respectively. At graduation he received a rabbinical diploma, which was recognized by the state. To supplement the regular course of training there were students' societies in both departments.

The library of the institute contained about 25,000 volumes of manuscripts and printed works, which were accessible to all in the reading-room.

References 
 
 Moshe Carmilly-Weinberger: The Rabbinical Seminary of Budapest, 1877-1977: A centennial volume. Sepher-Hermon Press, New York 1986.

Bibliography (Jewish Encyclopedia) 

 József Bánóczi, Gesch. des Ersten Jahrzehnts der Landes-Rabbinerschule (Supplement to the Annual Report for 1887-88);
 Ludwig Blau, Brill, Sámuel Löw, pp. 27–32, Budapest, 1902;
 S. Schill, A Budapesti Országos Rabbiképzöintézet Története, Budapest, 1896;
 Annual Reports (with literary supplements)

Jews and Judaism in Budapest
Jewish seminaries
Pest, Hungary
Universities in Budapest
Jewish Hungarian history
Jewish universities and colleges
Educational institutions established in 1877
Neolog Judaism synagogues
1877 establishments in Austria-Hungary